Omphalophana serrulata is a moth of the family Noctuidae. It is found in Iran.

References
 Ronkay, L. & Gyulai, P. (2006). "New Noctuidae (Lepidoptera) species from Iran and Tibet." Esperiana Buchreihe zur Entomologie 12: 211–241.

Cuculliinae
Moths of the Middle East
Moths described in 2006